S. Quinton "Quinn" Johnson IV (born March 27, 1969) is an American politician. He is a Democratic member of the Delaware House of Representatives, representing District 8. He was elected in 2008 to replace Bethany Hall-Long, who had resigned to run for a seat in the Delaware Senate.

Johnson earned his BS in business management from Salisbury University.

Electoral history
In 2008, Johnson won the general election with 4,372 votes (52.6%) against Republican nominee Martha Sturtevant.
In 2010, Johnson won the Democratic primary with 791 votes (68.1%), and went on to win the general election with 6,402 votes (63.2%) against Republican nominee Kathleen Rokosz.
In 2012, Johnson won the general election with 6,937 votes (69.2%) against Republican nominee Matthew Brown.
In 2014, Johnson won the general election with 3,562 votes (61.4%) against Republican nominee Matthew A. Brown.
In 2016, Johnson was unopposed in the general election, winning 8,703 votes.
In 2018, Johnson won the general election with 5,864 votes (62.9%) against Republican nominee Daniel Zitofsky and Libertarian nominee Cody McNutt.

References

External links
Official page at the Delaware General Assembly
Campaign site
 

1969 births
Living people
Democratic Party members of the Delaware House of Representatives
People from Middletown, Delaware
Salisbury University alumni
21st-century American politicians